The Most Fertile Man in Ireland is a 2000 Irish comedy film directed by Dudi Appleton and starring Bronagh Gallagher, Kris Marshall and James Nesbitt.

Cast
Kris Marshall as Eamonn Manley
Kathy Kiera Clarke as Rosie
Bronagh Gallagher as Millicent
James Nesbitt as Billy Wilson
Kenneth Cranham as Father
Tara Lynne O'Neill as Mary Mallory
Pauline McLynn as Maeve
Olivia Nash as Mother
Marc O'Shea as Raymond
Alvaro Lucchesi as Frank
Toyah Willcox as Dr. Johnson

Release
The film premiered at the Toronto International Film Festival on 15 September 2000.  It was then released in theaters in the United Kingdom in June 2003.

Reception
Patrick Peters of Empire awarded the film two stars out of five.  Jamie Russell of the BBC gave it three stars out of five.

References

External links
 
 

Irish comedy films
Films shot in Northern Ireland
Films shot in the Republic of Ireland
2000 comedy films
2000 films
County Donegal in fiction
2000s English-language films